The Wrotham transmitting station is located on the North Downs, close to the village of Wrotham in Kent, England and just north of the M20 motorway.

It is the main VHF FM transmitter for the national BBC radio networks in London and South East England. It currently transmits BBC Radio 1, 2, 3 & 4 and the independent national network Classic FM (125 kW ERP), BBC Radio Kent on 96.7 MHz (4.4 kW ERP) and KMFM West Kent on 101.6 MHz (0.2 kW ERP). (There are two prominent towers in the south of Greater London, Croydon and Crystal Palace, which provide a medium power (4 kW ERP) relay of the national radio channels, in addition to local stations).

Wrotham was the first station in the UK to broadcast on VHF/FM, with three services beginning officially on 2 May 1955. It broadcast the Home Service (now Radio 4), the Third Programme (now Radio 3) and the Light Programme (now Radio 2). The frequencies it used for these programmes on FM in 1955 are still in use today. On 17 April 1966, it became the first BBC transmitter to broadcast in stereo, with regular stereo broadcasts on the Third Programme from July 1966. On 18 December 1970, it began broadcasting Radio Medway (now Radio Kent) on 97.0 MHz.

Wrotham was one of two VHF transmitters identified as BBC network centres in the event of a nuclear strike on the UK. A Cabinet Office paper from 1975 provides details of construction work outstanding at Wrotham, including protected accommodation for engineering staff at a cost of about thirty thousand pounds. Wrotham was part of the War Time Broadcasting Service, designed to allow transmission of pre and post strike messages to the estimated 22 million battery-powered radios in the UK.

On 3 December 2010, Wrotham began transmitting DAB: CE London (London 1), Switch London (London 2), DRG London (London 3), Digital One and the BBC National DAB multiplex. The BBC National DAB multiplex is on the network's standard SFN, improving DAB coverage in North Kent and South London.

It is owned and operated by Arqiva.

Channels listed by frequency

Analogue radio (FM VHF)

Digital radio (DAB)

See also
 List of tallest buildings and structures in Great Britain

References

External links
 
 The Transmission Gallery: Wrotham Mast photographs and information
 The Transmission Gallery: FM coverage map
 The Transmission Gallery: History of Wrotham
 Location map (Multimap)

Buildings and structures in Kent
Transmitter sites in England
Tonbridge and Malling